Aulifeltet is a village in the municipality of Nes, Akershus, Norway. Its population is 2,683, of which 512 people live within the border of the neighboring municipality Sørum.

References

Villages in Akershus
Nes, Akershus